Kautokeino Church is a parish church of the Church of Norway in Kautokeino Municipality in Troms og Finnmark county, Norway. It is located in the village of Kautokeino. It is the main church for the Kautokeino parish which is part of the Indre Finnmark prosti (deanery) in the Diocese of Nord-Hålogaland. The red, wooden church was built in a long church style in 1958 using plans drawn up by the architect Finn Bryn. The church seats about 272 people.

History
The first church in Kautokeino was built in 1702 and it was one of the oldest buildings in all of Finnmark when the Germans burned it down near the end of World War II. After the war when funds were available, the church was rebuilt. It was completed in 1958.

Media gallery

See also
List of churches in Nord-Hålogaland

References

Kautokeino
Churches in Finnmark
Wooden churches in Norway
20th-century Church of Norway church buildings
Churches completed in 1958
1702 establishments in Norway
Long churches in Norway